Asaeli Boko (born 16 September 1981) is a Fijian rugby union number 8 who played for  and Sale Sharks. Boko, is known for his versatility and is able to pack down at second row, flanker or his favoured position of number 8. He was a key player in the Fijian's Autumn tour of 2009 starting in all three games against Ireland, Scotland and Romania. He also had a three-month trial at Saracens, looking to gain a contract for the 2010/11 season.

In October 2010, he was signed on by English club, Sale Sharks whose head coach Mike Brewer has previously worked with Boko during Fiji's 2009 Autumn Internationals.

Career
Boko is one of a select few Fijians to have played for his country at both international 7's and 15's something which is considered an honour in Fiji.

References

External links
 
 

Living people
Fijian rugby union players
Fiji international rugby union players
1981 births
Sale Sharks players
Fijian expatriate rugby union players
Expatriate rugby union players in England
Fijian expatriate sportspeople in England
Sportspeople from Nadi
I-Taukei Fijian people
Rugby union number eights